The Air Botswana Employees' Union (ABEU) is a trade union affiliate of the Botswana Federation of Trade Unions in Botswana.

References

Botswana Federation of Trade Unions
Aviation trade unions
Organisations based in Gaborone
Transport trade unions in Botswana